Shassiri Nahimana (born 5 August 1993) is a Burundian professional footballer who plays as a midfielder for Premier League club Vital'O FC and the Burundi national football team.

Early life
Shassiri Nahimana was born in Buyenzi, Bujumbura. Nahimana is the third born among his siblings and grew up playing football. Supported by his parents, in 2005, at the age of 12 he joined Rafina FC. Few years later in 2009–2010 he joined Havana FC, where he participated in a local competition and was soon scouted by Inter Star to attend a trial at the club. Though initially scared, he eventually attended the trials and got signed up by the club.

Club career
After first joining Inter Star in 2012, he went to Vital'O in 2014, where he won two consecutive Burundi Premier League in the 2014–15 and 2015–16 season. At the end of the 2015–16 season, Nahimana was named the Best Player of the Season, winning the award over teammates Arakaza MacArthur and Hussein Shabani. He also played a pivotal role in his teams 2016 Burundian Cup run, where Vital'O lost 4–3 on penalties to Le Messager Ngozi in the final.

After a successful career at Vital'O, he joined Rwandan club Rayon Sports in 2016. On 24 December 2016, he scored his first hat-trick for Rayon Sports, thrashing Musanze 4–1. On 17 May 2019, he won the 2016–17 Rwanda Premier League with the club, after Rayon won 2–1 against Mukura Victory Sports and took an unassailable 13 point lead over rivals and former champions APR FC, with four matches to spare.

At the end of the 2017–18 season, Nahimana joined Omani club Nizwa, and in January 2019 moved to Saudi club Al-Mujazzal on a 1-year deal.

International career
Nahimana was invited by Lofty Naseem, the national team coach, to represent Burundi in the 2014 African Nations Championship held in South Africa.

On 21 June 2015, he scored his first ever international goal in a 2–1 win against Djibouti in the 2016 African Nations Championship qualification. Burundi progressed to the next round by winning 4–1 on aggregate, but failed to qualify for the finals after losing 3–2 on aggregate to Ethiopia in the next round.

On 11 June 2019, Nahimana was named in Burundi's 23-man squad for the 2019 Africa Cup of Nations in Egypt.

Stats

International goals
Scores and results list Uganda's goal tally first.

Honours

Club

Vital'O
Burundi Premier League (2): 2014–15, 2015–16
Rayon Sports
Rwanda Premier League (1): 2016–17

Individual
Amstel Ligue Best Player of the Season: 2015–16

References

External links

1993 births
Living people
Sportspeople from Bujumbura
Burundian footballers
Association football midfielders
Vital'O F.C. players
Rayon Sports F.C. players
Al-Mujazzal Club players
Al-Entesar Club players
Futuro Kings FC players
Saudi First Division League players
Saudi Second Division players
Burundi international footballers
Burundi A' international footballers
2014 African Nations Championship players
2019 Africa Cup of Nations players
Burundian expatriate footballers
Burundian expatriate sportspeople in Rwanda
Expatriate footballers in Rwanda
Burundian expatriate sportspeople in Saudi Arabia
Expatriate footballers in Saudi Arabia
Burundian expatriate sportspeople in Oman
Expatriate footballers in Oman
Burundian expatriate sportspeople in Equatorial Guinea
Expatriate footballers in Equatorial Guinea